Tazehkand (also Romanized as Tāzehkand; also known as Tāzehkand-e Chaghāl) is a village in Chaldoran-e Shomali Rural District, in the Central District of Chaldoran County, West Azerbaijan Province, Iran. At the 2006 census, its population was 482, in 104 families.

References 

Populated places in Chaldoran County